Kimberley Ann Santiago (born November 23, 1961) is an American Olympic athlete and professional rowing coxswain.

Her team finished 5th in the 1988 Winter Olympics in Seoul. In the 1987 World Rowing Championships in Copenhagen, she also placed 5th. At the 1986 Goodwill Games in Moscow, Santiago's team placed 2nd.

References 

Living people
1961 births
American female rowers
Olympic rowers of the United States
Rowers at the 1988 Summer Olympics
Coxswains (rowing)
Sportspeople from Evanston, Illinois
Competitors at the 1986 Goodwill Games
21st-century American women